John Rickingale D.D. also known as John de Rickingale (died 1429) was a medieval Bishop of Chichester, Master of Gonville Hall, Cambridge, Chancellor of the University of Cambridge and Chancellor of York Minster.

Rickingale was the last rector of Hemingbrough rectory before Prior John Wessington converted it into a collegiate church. This happened when Rickingale was nominated as bishop of Chichester on 27 February 1426. The nomination was through the interest of John of Lancaster, 1st Duke of Bedford, to whom he was confessor. He was consecrated in Mortlake parish church on 30 or 3 June 1426. He was an early humanist.

Death
Rickingale died about 6 July 1429 and is buried in the north aisle of Chichester Cathedral. He left instructions that a marble effigy of himself should be left as a monument over his tomb. The following verses are engraved on his tomb:

The executors of Rickingale's will were Peter Schelton, Master & treasurer of the church in Chichester, Edward Hunt, canon of Chichester, John Eppe, parson of Anderby and his nephew John Mannyng.

References

1429 deaths
Bishops of Chichester
15th-century English Roman Catholic bishops
Year of birth unknown
Masters of Gonville Hall, Cambridge